Chuang Suo-hang (born 24 October 1955) is a Taiwanese politician.

Education
Chuang studied political science at National Taiwan University and earned a Ph.D in the subject at the University of Southern California.

Political career
Chuang joined the Democratic Progressive Party in 2002. He served as spokesperson of the Executive Yuan until 2003, when he was named to the Overseas Chinese Affairs Commission. By 2004, Chuang had stepped down from OCAC to represent the DPP in that year's legislative elections. Upon taking office as legislator, he was named leader of the Exchange Association of Taiwanese and French Legislators within the Legislative Yuan. After losing reelection in 2008 to Wu Chin-chih, Chuang became director of the Democratic Progressive Party's Policy Research Committee and acted as party spokesperson. He again represented the DPP in the 2012 legislative elections, and lost. Chuang launched his New Taipei mayoral campaign in 2013, and lost to Yu Shyi-kun in a primary. Shortly after the announcement of the New Southbound Policy, Chuang was named to a DPP-convened committee charged with promoting it. In 2017, Chuang was appointed a vice chair of the Taiwan External Trade Development Council and took on the role as chairman of the Taipei World Trade Center in January 2020. Chuang was appointed Taiwan's representative to Thailand in June 2022, succeeding Lee Ying-yuan, who resigned the position in August 2021.

References

1955 births
Living people
New Taipei Members of the Legislative Yuan
Members of the 6th Legislative Yuan
Democratic Progressive Party Members of the Legislative Yuan
Taiwanese politicians of Hakka descent
University of Southern California alumni
National Taiwan University alumni
Taiwanese expatriates in the United States
Representatives of Taiwan to Thailand